Round Trip is the debut album led by saxophonist Ralph Moore which was recorded in 1985 and released on the Reservoir label in 1987.

Reception 

In his review on AllMusic, Scott Yanow called it "A fine hard bop date and an excellent start to Ralph Moore's solo career".

Track listing 
All compositions by Ralph Moore except where noted
 "Dunes" – 6:30
 "Bewitched, Bothered and Bewildered" (Richard Rodgers, Lorenz Hart) – 6:08
 "Round Trip" (Kevin Eubanks) – 5:07
 "Lotus Blossom" (Kenny Dorham) – 6:04
 "Monique" – 6:25	
 "Back Room Blues" (Brian Lynch) – 6:56
 "Sleigh Ride" (Leroy Anderson) – 5:13 Additional track on CD reissue

Personnel 
Ralph Moore – tenor saxophone
Brian Lynch – trumpet
Kevin Eubanks – guitar
Benny Green – piano
Rufus Reid – bass 
Kenny Washington – drums

References 

Ralph Moore albums
1987 albums
Reservoir Records albums
Albums recorded at Van Gelder Studio